Sir Paolo Dingli GCMG was the chief justice of Malta from 1854 to 1859.

References 

Maltese knights
19th-century Maltese judges
Year of birth missing
Year of death missing